John Fitzgerald Kennedy Federal Building is a United States federal government office building located in the Government Center area of Boston, Massachusetts, adjacent to City Hall Plaza and diagonally across from Boston City Hall. An example of 1960s modern architecture, and designed by Walter Gropius and The Architects Collaborative with Samuel Glaser, it is a complex that consists of two offset 26-floor towers that sit on-axis to each other and a low rise building of four floors that connects to the two towers through an enclosed glass corridor. The complex was built in 1963-1966. It was listed on the National Register of Historic Places in 2021.

Significant events
1937: Walter Gropius immigrates to the United States and exposes Modern architecture
1945: Gropius founds The Architects Collaborative
1961: Gropius, TAC, and Glaser retained to design federal building in Boston
1963: Construction begins; building is named to honor President Kennedy after he is assassinated
1966: Construction completed and building occupied

Building facts
Location: 15 Sudbury Street
Architects: Walter Gropius and The Architects Collaborative with Samuel Glaser
Structural engineers: LeMessurier Consultants
Construction dates: 1963-1966
Architectural style: Sixties Modern
Primary materials: Steel, reinforced concrete, and glass
Prominent features: Monolithic towers; landscaped plaza; public art

Architecture
The building is bounded by Cambridge, Sudbury, and Congress streets. The building consists of twin 26-story high-rise towers, which sit on axis to each other, and a low, 4-story building. This combination of tall towers paired with low buildings is a common Modern form that is used extensively throughout the United States and abroad. The double towers increase the number of offices lit by natural light and decrease the visual bulk that a single monolithic building would create. The building contains .

The exterior of the towers is constructed of pre-cast reinforced concrete. The lower sections are faced with polished granite. All aluminum work has a dark anodized finish in a medium gray tone. A glass-enclosed walkway connects the four-story building to the towers. Like the towers, the low building's facade is made of concrete and glass. Overall, the exterior lacks ornamentation, instead displaying a stark functionality. Bands of windows wrap around the towers; corner windows have rounded edges. The bases of the towers have arcades with entrances set back beneath a covered area supported by piers. The tops of the towers are distinguished by metal louvers. An exposed glass atrium connects the two towers at the ground level. A glass-enclosed walkway connects the four-story building to the towers. Like the towers, the low building's facade is made of concrete and glass. Vertical slabs form piers that interrupt the horizontality of the building and create the off-center entrance, which is articulated by a cantilevered porch. A protruding second story creates a covered pathway to shelter visitors.

The building's design result in 45% of the available space being occupied by the structure.  The remaining portion contains terraces, plazas, landscaping, a sunken patio, and driveways. Plazas are surfaced with stone in most sections. Paved walkways are interspersed throughout. A tiered stair platform of cement and brick leads to the low building.

In 1963, Gropius and Glaser saw sculpture by artist Dimitri Hadzi, who worked in Modern abstract forms, and decided Hadzi's style would be appropriate for the federal building. They commissioned Hadzi to produce a bronze sculpture called Thermopylae, which is located in front of one of the towers. The abstract sculpture was created in 1966 and inspired by President Kennedy's book, Profiles in Courage, and his war record. Two other artists created tributes to John F. Kennedy. Herbert Ferber designed an abstract sculpture of welded copper and stainless steel titled Full Circle: Profile in Courage, which is in the interior light court. New England Elegy, a controversial mural by Robert Motherwell, occupies the area between the towers and the low-rise building. Revolving exhibits in the building often focus on aspects of Kennedy's life and presidency.

Selected tenants
As of 2010, the Kennedy building housed offices for:
 Elizabeth Warren, U.S. Senator from Massachusetts
 U.S. Citizenship and Immigration Services
 U.S. Department of Health & Human Services
 U.S. Department of Labor
 U.S. Department of Veterans Affairs
 U.S. Immigration Court
 U.S. Internal Revenue Service, Taxpayer Service Division
 U.S. Social Security Administration
 U.S. Homeland Security Investigations
 U.S. Drug Enforcement Administration
 U.S. Federal Protective Service

Gallery

See also
 American House (Boston), demolished 19th-century building that stood on the site of the JFK Federal building
 Hanover Street (Boston, Massachusetts), partially demolished
 Scollay Square, now the site of Government Center
 List of courthouses in Boston
 List of memorials to John F. Kennedy
 National Register of Historic Places listings in northern Boston

References
Notes

Sources

External links

 General Services Administration (GSA) entry

Buildings of the United States government in Massachusetts
J.F.K. Federal Building
Twin towers
Government Center, Boston
Government buildings completed in 1966
Walter Gropius buildings
National Register of Historic Places in Boston
Government buildings in Boston